In geometry, a Coxeter–Dynkin diagram (or Coxeter diagram, Coxeter graph) is a graph with numerically labeled edges (called branches) representing the spatial relations between a collection of mirrors (or reflecting hyperplanes). It describes a kaleidoscopic construction: each graph "node" represents a mirror (domain facet) and the label attached to a branch encodes the dihedral angle order between two mirrors (on a domain ridge), that is, the amount by which the angle between the reflective planes can be multiplied to get 180 degrees. An unlabeled branch implicitly represents order-3 (60 degrees), and each pair of nodes that is not connected by a branch at all (such as non-adjacent nodes) represents a pair of mirrors at order-2 (90 degrees).

Each diagram represents a Coxeter group, and Coxeter groups are classified by their associated diagrams.

Dynkin diagrams are closely related objects, which differ from Coxeter diagrams in two respects: firstly, branches labeled "4" or greater are directed, while Coxeter diagrams are undirected; secondly, Dynkin diagrams must satisfy an additional (crystallographic) restriction, namely that the only allowed branch labels are 2, 3, 4, and 6. Dynkin diagrams correspond to and are used to classify root systems and therefore semisimple Lie algebras.

Description
Branches of a Coxeter–Dynkin diagram are labeled with a rational number p, representing a dihedral angle of 180°/p. When  the angle is 90° and the mirrors have no interaction, so the branch can be omitted from the diagram. If a branch is unlabeled, it is assumed to have , representing an angle of 60°. Two parallel mirrors have a branch marked with "∞". In principle, n mirrors can be represented by a complete graph in which all n( branches are drawn. In practice, nearly all interesting configurations of mirrors include a number of right angles, so the corresponding branches are omitted.

Diagrams can be labeled by their graph structure. The first forms studied by Ludwig Schläfli are the orthoschemes which have linear graphs that generate regular polytopes and regular honeycombs. Plagioschemes are simplices represented by branching graphs, and cycloschemes are simplices represented by cyclic graphs.

Schläfli matrix 
Every Coxeter diagram has a corresponding Schläfli matrix 
(so named after Ludwig Schläfli), with matrix elements  where p is the branch order between the pairs of mirrors. As a matrix of cosines, it is also called a Gramian matrix after Jørgen Pedersen Gram. All Coxeter group Schläfli matrices are symmetric because their root vectors are normalized. It is related closely to the Cartan matrix, used in the similar but directed graph Dynkin diagrams in the limited cases of p = 2,3,4, and 6, which are not symmetric in general.

The determinant of the Schläfli matrix, called the Schläflian, and its sign determines whether the group is finite (positive), affine (zero), indefinite (negative). This rule is called Schläfli's Criterion. 

The eigenvalues of the Schläfli matrix determines whether a Coxeter group is of finite type (all positive), affine type (all non-negative, at least one is zero), or indefinite type (otherwise). The indefinite type is sometimes further subdivided, e.g. into hyperbolic and other Coxeter groups. However, there are multiple non-equivalent definitions for hyperbolic Coxeter groups.  We use the following definition: A Coxeter group with connected diagram is hyperbolic if it is neither of finite nor affine type, but every proper connected subdiagram is of finite or affine type. A hyperbolic Coxeter group is compact if all subgroups are finite (i.e. have positive determinants), and paracompact if all its subgroups are finite or affine (i.e. have nonnegative determinants).

Finite and affine groups are also called elliptical and parabolic respectively. Hyperbolic groups are also called Lannér, after F. Lannér who enumerated the compact hyperbolic groups in 1950, and Koszul (or quasi-Lannér) for the paracompact groups.

Rank 2 Coxeter groups
For rank 2, the type of a Coxeter group is fully determined by the determinant of the Schläfli matrix, as it is simply the product of the eigenvalues: Finite type (positive determinant), affine type (zero determinant) or hyperbolic (negative determinant). Coxeter uses an equivalent bracket notation which lists sequences of branch orders as a substitute for the node-branch graphic diagrams. Rational solutions [p/q], also exist, with gcd(p,q)=1, which define overlapping fundamental domains. For example, 3/2, 4/3, 5/2, 5/3, 5/4, and 6/5.

Geometric visualizations
The Coxeter–Dynkin diagram can be seen as a graphic description of the fundamental domain of mirrors. A mirror represents a hyperplane within a given dimensional spherical or Euclidean or hyperbolic space. (In 2D spaces, a mirror is a line, and in 3D a mirror is a plane).

These visualizations show the fundamental domains for 2D and 3D Euclidean groups, and 2D spherical groups. For each the Coxeter diagram can be deduced by identifying the hyperplane mirrors and labelling their connectivity, ignoring 90-degree dihedral angles (order 2).

Finite Coxeter groups
See also :polytope families for a table of end-node uniform polytopes associated with these groups.
Three different symbols are given for the same groups – as a letter/number, as a bracketed set of numbers, and as the Coxeter diagram.
The bifurcated Dn group is a half or alternated version of the Cn group.
The bifurcated Dn and En groups are also labeled by a superscript form [3a,b,c] where a,b,c are the numbers of segments in each of the three branches.

Application with uniform polytopes

Coxeter–Dynkin diagrams can explicitly enumerate nearly all classes of uniform polytope and uniform tessellations. Every uniform polytope with pure reflective symmetry (all but a few special cases have pure reflectional symmetry) can be represented by a Coxeter–Dynkin diagram with permutations of markups. Each uniform polytope can be generated using such mirrors and a single generator point: mirror images create new points as reflections, then polytope edges can be defined between points and a mirror image point. Faces are generated by the repeated reflection of an edge eventually wrapping around to the original generator; the final shape, as well as any higher-dimensional facets, are likewise created by the face being reflected to enclose an area.

To specify the generating vertex, one or more nodes are marked with rings, meaning that the vertex is not on the mirror(s) represented by the ringed node(s). (If two or more mirrors are marked, the vertex is equidistant from them.) A mirror is active (creates reflections) only with respect to points not on it. A diagram needs at least one active node to represent a polytope. An unconnected diagram (subgroups separated by order-2 branches, or orthogonal mirrors) requires at least one active node in each subgraph.

Uniform polytopes with one ring correspond to generator points at the corners of the fundamental domain simplex. Two rings correspond to the edges of simplex and have a degree of freedom, with only the midpoint as the uniform solution for equal edge lengths. In general k-ring generator points are on (k-1)-faces of the simplex, and if all the nodes are ringed, the generator point is in the interior of the simplex.

The special case of uniform polytopes with non-reflectional symmetry is represented by a secondary markup where the central dot of a ringed node is removed (called a hole). These shapes are alternations of polytopes with reflective symmetry, implying that every other vertex is deleted. The resulting polytope will have a subsymmetry of the original Coxeter group. A truncated alternation is called a snub.
 A single node represents a single mirror. This is called group A1. If ringed this creates a line segment perpendicular to the mirror, represented as {}.
 Two unattached nodes represent two perpendicular mirrors. If both nodes are ringed, a rectangle can be created, or a square if the point is at equal distance from both mirrors.
 Two nodes attached by an order-n branch can create an n-gon if the point is on one mirror, and a 2n-gon if the point is off both mirrors. This forms the I1(n) group.
 Two parallel mirrors can represent an infinite polygon I1(∞) group, also called Ĩ1.
 Three mirrors in a triangle form images seen in a traditional kaleidoscope and can be represented by three nodes connected in a triangle. Repeating examples will have branches labeled as (3 3 3), (2 4 4), (2 3 6), although the last two can be drawn as a line (with the 2 branches ignored). These will generate uniform tilings.
 Three mirrors can generate uniform polyhedra; including rational numbers gives the set of Schwarz triangles.
 Three mirrors with one perpendicular to the other two can form the uniform prisms.

The duals of the uniform polytopes are sometimes marked up with a perpendicular slash replacing ringed nodes, and a slash-hole for hole nodes of the snubs. For example,  represents a rectangle (as two active orthogonal mirrors), and  represents its dual polygon, the rhombus.

Example polyhedra and tilings 
For example, the B3 Coxeter group has a diagram: . This is also called octahedral symmetry.

There are 7 convex uniform polyhedra that can be constructed from this symmetry group and 3 from its alternation subsymmetries, each with a uniquely marked up Coxeter–Dynkin diagram. The Wythoff symbol represents a special case of the Coxeter diagram for rank 3 graphs, with all 3 branch orders named, rather than suppressing the order 2 branches. The Wythoff symbol is able to handle the snub form, but not general alternations without all nodes ringed.

The same constructions can be made on disjointed (orthogonal) Coxeter groups like the uniform prisms, and can be seen more clearly as tilings of dihedrons and hosohedrons on the sphere, like this [6]×[] or [6,2] family:

In comparison, the [6,3],  family produces a parallel set of 7 uniform tilings of the Euclidean plane, and their dual tilings. There are again 3 alternations and some half symmetry version.

In the hyperbolic plane [7,3],  family produces a parallel set of uniform tilings, and their dual tilings. There is only 1 alternation (snub) since all branch orders are odd. Many other hyperbolic families of uniform tilings can be seen at uniform tilings in hyperbolic plane.

Affine Coxeter groups
Families of convex uniform Euclidean tessellations are defined by the affine Coxeter groups. These groups are identical to the finite groups with the inclusion of one added node. In letter names they are given the same letter with a "~" above the letter. The index refers to the finite group, so the rank is the index plus 1. (Ernst Witt symbols for the affine groups are given as also)
: diagrams of this type are cycles. (Also Pn)
 is associated with the hypercube regular tessellation  family. (Also Rn)
 related to C by one removed mirror. (Also Sn)
 related to C by two removed mirrors. (Also Qn)
(Also T7, T8, T9)
 forms the {3,4,3,3} regular tessellation. (Also U5)
 forms 30-60-90 triangle fundamental domains. (Also V3)
 is two parallel mirrors. (Also W2)

Composite groups can also be defined as orthogonal projects. The most common use , like ,  represents square or rectangular checker board domains in the Euclidean plane. And   represents triangular prism fundamental domains in Euclidean 3-space.

Hyperbolic Coxeter groups
There are many infinite hyperbolic Coxeter groups. Hyperbolic groups are categorized as compact or not, with compact groups having bounded fundamental domains. Compact simplex hyperbolic groups (Lannér simplices) exist as rank 3 to 5. Paracompact simplex groups (Koszul simplices) exist up to rank 10. Hypercompact (Vinberg polytopes) groups have been explored but not been fully determined. In 2006, Allcock proved that there are infinitely many compact Vinberg polytopes for dimension up to 6, and infinitely many finite-volume Vinberg polytopes for dimension up to 19, so a complete enumeration is not possible. All of these fundamental reflective domains, both simplices and nonsimplices, are often called Coxeter polytopes or sometimes less accurately Coxeter polyhedra.

Hyperbolic groups in H2

Two-dimensional hyperbolic triangle groups exist as rank 3 Coxeter diagrams, defined by triangle (p q r) for:

There are infinitely many compact triangular hyperbolic Coxeter groups, including linear and triangle graphs. The linear graphs exist for right triangles (with r=2).

Paracompact Coxeter groups of rank 3 exist as limits to the compact ones.

Arithmetic triangle group 

The hyperbolic triangle groups that are also arithmetic groups form a finite subset. By computer search the complete list was determined by Kisao Takeuchi in his 1977 paper Arithmetic triangle groups. There are 85 total, 76 compact and 9 paracompact.

Hyperbolic Coxeter polygons above triangles 

Other H2 hyperbolic kaleidoscopes can be constructed from higher order polygons. Like triangle groups these kaleidoscopes can be identified by a cyclic sequence of mirror intersection orders around the fundamental domain, as (a b c d ...), or equivalently in orbifold notation as *abcd.... Coxeter–Dynkin diagrams for these polygonal kaleidoscopes can be seen as a degenerate (n-1)-simplex fundamental domains, with a cyclic of branches order a,b,c... and the remaining n*(n-3)/2 branches are labeled as infinite (∞) representing the non-intersecting mirrors.

For example, a quadrilateral domain (a b c d) will have two infinite order branches connecting ultraparallel mirrors.

The highest quadrilateral domain (∞ ∞ ∞ ∞) is an infinite square, represented by a complete tetrahedral graph with 4 perimeter branches as ideal vertices and two diagonal branches as infinity (shown as dotted lines) for ultraparallel mirrors: .

Compact (Lannér simplex groups) 
Compact hyperbolic groups are called Lannér groups after Folke Lannér who first studied them in 1950. They only exist as rank 4 and 5 graphs. Coxeter studied the linear hyperbolic coxeter groups in his 1954 paper Regular Honeycombs in hyperbolic space, which included two rational solutions in hyperbolic 4-space: [5/2,5,3,3] =  and [5,5/2,5,3] = .

Ranks 4–5

The fundamental domain of either of the two bifurcating groups, [5,31,1] and [5,3,31,1], is double that of a corresponding linear group, [5,3,4] and [5,3,3,4] respectively. Letter names are given by Johnson as extended Witt symbols.

Paracompact (Koszul simplex groups) 

Paracompact (also called noncompact) hyperbolic Coxeter groups contain affine subgroups and have asymptotic simplex fundamental domains. The highest paracompact hyperbolic Coxeter group is rank 10. These groups are named after French mathematician Jean-Louis Koszul. They are also called quasi-Lannér groups extending the compact Lannér groups. The list was determined complete by computer search by M. Chein and published in 1969.

By Vinberg, all but eight of these 72 compact and paracompact simplices are arithmetic.

Ideal simplices 

There are 5 hyperbolic Coxeter groups expressing ideal simplices, graphs where removal of any one node results in an affine Coxeter group. Thus all vertices of this ideal simplex are at infinity.

Ranks 4–10

There are a total of 58 paracompact hyperbolic Coxeter groups from rank 4 through 10. All 58 are grouped below in five categories. Letter symbols are given by Johnson as Extended Witt symbols, using PQRSTWUV from the affine Witt symbols, and adding LMNOXYZ. These hyperbolic groups are given an overline, or a hat, for cycloschemes. The bracket notation from Coxeter is a linearized representation of the Coxeter group.

Subgroup relations of paracompact hyperbolic groups
These trees represents subgroup relations of paracompact hyperbolic groups. Subgroup indices on each connection are given in red. Subgroups of index 2 represent a mirror removal, and fundamental domain doubling. Others can be inferred by commensurability (integer ratio of volumes) for the tetrahedral domains.

Hypercompact Coxeter groups (Vinberg polytopes) 
Just as the hyperbolic plane  has nontriangular polygonal domains, non-simplex domains similarly exist in higher-dimensional hyperbolic spaces. These nonsimplex domains can be considered degenerate simplices with non-intersecting mirrors given infinite order; in a Coxeter diagram, such branches are given dotted or dashed lines. These nonsimplex domains are called Vinberg polytopes, after Ernest Vinberg who devised an algorithm for finding nonsimplex fundamental domain of a hyperbolic reflection group.

In a simplex-based domain, there are  mirrors for -dimensional space. In non-simplex domains, there are more than  mirrors. The list is finite, but not completely known.

Hypercompact Coxeter groups in three dimensional space or higher differ from two dimensional groups in one essential respect. Two hyperbolic -gons having the same angles in the same cyclic order may have different edge lengths and are not in general congruent. In contrast Vinberg polytopes in 3 dimensions or higher are completely determined by the dihedral angles.

Vinberg polytopes with rank  for -dimensional space 

The complete list of compact hyperbolic Vinberg polytopes with rank  mirrors for  dimensions has been enumerated by F. Esselmann in 1996. A partial list was published in 1974 by I. M. Kaplinskaya.

The complete list of paracompact solutions was published by P. Tumarkin in 2003, with dimensions from 3 to 17.

The doubled fundamental domain changes from a tetrahedron into a quadrilateral pyramid. Another pyramids include [4,4,1+,4] = [∞,4,4,∞],  = .

Other valid paracompact graphs with quadrilateral pyramid fundamental domains include:

Another subgroup [1+,41,1,1] = [∞,4,1+,4,∞] = [∞[6]].  =  = .

Vinberg polytopes with rank  for -dimensional space 

There are a finite number of degenerate fundamental simplices exist up through dimension 8. These groups are labeled by dotted/broken lines for ultraparallel branches. 

The complete list of compact Vinberg polytopes with rank  mirrors for  dimensions was first enumerated by P. Tumarkin in 2004 and then published completely in 2007 with some amendments.  The highest figure was discovered by Bugaenko in 1984 in dimension 8, rank 11. There are no solutions in dimension 7. 

Between dimensions 4 and 8, rank 7 to 11 Coxeter groups are counted as 40, 16, 3, 0, and 1 respectively:

On the other hand, the complete list of non-compact Vinberg polytopes with rank  mirrors and with one non-simple vertex for  dimensions has been enumerated by Mike Roberts.

Vinberg polytopes with rank  for -dimensional space 

There are a finite number of degenerate fundamental simplices that exist up through dimension 7. Compact Vinberg polytopes with rank  mirrors for  dimensions were explored by A. Felikson and P. Tumarkin first in 2005, with results formally published in 2008. They reported finding a single unique solution in dimension 7 with 11 mirror facets, and proved that no other solutions exist in higher dimensions.

Lorentzian groups

Lorentzian groups for simplex domains can be defined as graphs beyond the paracompact hyperbolic forms. These are sometimes called super-ideal simplices and are also related to a Lorentzian geometry, named after Hendrik Lorentz in the field of special and general relativity space-time, containing one (or more) time-like dimensional components whose self dot products are negative. Danny Calegari calls these convex cocompact Coxeter groups in n-dimensional hyperbolic space.

Level 2
A 1982 paper by George Maxwell, Sphere Packings and Hyperbolic Reflection Groups, enumerates the finite list of Lorentzian reflection groups of rank 5 to 11. He calls them level 2, meaning removal any permutation of 2 nodes leaves a finite or Euclidean graph.

All higher-order branch Coxeter groups of rank-4 are Lorentzian, ending in the limit as a complete graph 3-simplex Coxeter-Dynkin diagram with 6 infinite order branches, which can be expressed as [∞[3,3]]. Rank 5-11 have a finite number of groups 186, 66, 36, 13, 10, 8, and 4 Lorentzian groups respectively. 

A 2013 paper by H. Chen and J.-P. Labbé, Lorentzian Coxeter groups and Boyd--Maxwell ball packings, recomputed and published the complete list, adding 3 new groups of rank 5, 189 total.

This is the complete list, including graphics for ranks 5 to 7.

Very-extended Coxeter diagrams
One usage includes a very-extended definition from the direct Dynkin diagram usage which considers affine groups as extended, hyperbolic groups over-extended, and a third node as very-extended simple groups. These extensions are usually marked by an exponent of 1,2, or 3 + symbols for the number of extended nodes. This extending series can be extended backwards, by sequentially removing the nodes from the same position in the graph, although the process stops after removing branching node. The E8 extended family is the most commonly shown example extending backwards from E3 and forwards to E11.

The extending process can define a limited series of Coxeter graphs that progress from finite to affine to hyperbolic to Lorentzian. The determinant of the Cartan matrices determine where the series changes from finite (positive) to affine (zero) to hyperbolic (negative), and ending as a Lorentzian group, containing at least one hyperbolic subgroup. The noncrystalographic Hn groups forms an extended series where H4 is extended as a compact hyperbolic and over-extended into a lorentzian group.

The determinant of the Schläfli matrix by rank are:

 det(A1n=[2n-1]) = 2n (Finite for all n)
 det(An=[3n-1]) = n+1 (Finite for all n)
 det(Bn=[4,3n-2]) = 2 (Finite for all n)
 det(Dn=[3n-3,1,1]) = 4 (Finite for all n)

Determinants of the Schläfli matrix in exceptional series are:
 det(En=[3n-3,2,1]) = 9-n (Finite for E3(=A2A1), E4(=A4), E5(=D5), E6, E7 and E8, affine at E9, hyperbolic at E10)
 det([3n-4,3,1]) = 2(8-n) (Finite for n=4 to 7, affine, and hyperbolic at n=8.)
 det([3n-4,2,2]) = 3(7-n) (Finite for n=4 to 6, affine, and hyperbolic at n=7.)
 det(Fn=[3,4,3n-3]) = 5-n (Finite for F3(=B3) to F4, affine at F5, hyperbolic at F6)
 det(Gn=[6,3n-2]) = 3-n (Finite for G2, affine at G3, hyperbolic at G4)

Geometric folding

A (simply-laced) Coxeter–Dynkin diagram (finite, affine, or hyperbolic) that has a symmetry (satisfying one condition, below) can be quotiented by the symmetry, yielding a new, generally multiply laced diagram, with the process called "folding".

For example, in D4 folding to G2, the edge in G2 points from the class of the 3 outer nodes (valence 1), to the class of the central node (valence 3). And E8 folds into 2 copies of H4, the second copy scaled by τ.

Geometrically this corresponds to orthogonal projections of uniform polytopes and tessellations. Notably, any finite simply-laced Coxeter–Dynkin diagram can be folded to I2(h), where h is the Coxeter number, which corresponds geometrically to a projection to the Coxeter plane.

Complex reflections
Coxeter–Dynkin diagrams have been extended to complex space, Cn where nodes are unitary reflections of period greater than 2. Nodes are labeled by an index, assumed to be 2 for ordinary real reflection if suppressed. Coxeter writes the complex group, p[q]r, as diagram .

Its real representation is a regular polygon, {p}. When p = 2, the generator is eπi = –1, the same as a point reflection in the real plane.

The symmetry group of a regular complex polygon  is not called a Coxeter group, but instead a Shephard group, a type of Complex reflection group.

The symmetry group p1[q]p2 is represented by 2 generators R1, R2, where: R1p1 = R2p2 = I. If q is even, (R2R1)q/2 = (R1R2)q/2. If q is odd, (R2R1)(q-1)/2R2 = (R1R2)(q-1)/2R1. When q is odd, p1=p2.

The  group  or [1 1 1]p is defined by 3 period 2 unitary reflections {R1, R2, R3}: R12 = R12 = R32 = (R1R2)3 =  (R2R3)3 = (R3R1)3 = (R1R2R3R1)p = 1. The period p can be seen as a double rotation in real .

A similar  group  or [1 1 1](p) is defined by 3 period 2 unitary reflections {R1, R2, R3}: R12 = R12 = R32 = (R1R2)3 =  (R2R3)3 = (R3R1)3 = (R1R2R3R2)p = 1.

See also
Coxeter group
Schwarz triangle
Goursat tetrahedron
Dynkin diagram
Uniform polytope
Wythoff symbol
Uniform polyhedron
List of uniform polyhedra
List of uniform planar tilings
Uniform 4-polytope
Convex uniform honeycomb
Convex uniform honeycombs in hyperbolic space
Wythoff construction and Wythoff symbol

References

Further reading

James E. Humphreys, Reflection Groups and Coxeter Groups, Cambridge studies in advanced mathematics, 29 (1990)
Kaleidoscopes: Selected Writings of H.S.M. Coxeter, edited by F. Arthur Sherk, Peter McMullen, Anthony C. Thompson, Asia Ivic Weiss, Wiley-Interscience Publication, 1995, Googlebooks 
 (Paper 17) Coxeter, The Evolution of Coxeter-Dynkin diagrams, [Nieuw Archief voor Wiskunde 9 (1991) 233-248]
Coxeter, The Beauty of Geometry: Twelve Essays, Dover Publications, 1999,  (Chapter 3: Wythoff's Construction for Uniform Polytopes)
Coxeter, Regular Polytopes (1963), Macmillan Company
Regular Polytopes, Third edition, (1973), Dover edition,  (Chapter 5: The Kaleidoscope, and Section 11.3 Representation by graphs)
 H.S.M. Coxeter and W. O. J. Moser. Generators and Relations for Discrete Groups 4th ed, Springer-Verlag. New York. 1980
Norman Johnson, Geometries and Transformations, Chapters 11,12,13, preprint 2011
N. W. Johnson, R. Kellerhals, J. G. Ratcliffe, S. T. Tschantz, The size of a hyperbolic Coxeter simplex, Transformation Groups 1999, Volume 4, Issue 4, pp 329–353  
 Norman W. Johnson and Asia Ivic Weiss Quadratic Integers and Coxeter Groups PDF Can. J. Math. Vol. 51 (6), 1999 pp. 1307–1336

External links

October 1978 discussion on the history of the Coxeter diagrams by Coxeter and Dynkin in Toronto, Canada; Eugene Dynkin Collection of Mathematics Interviews, Cornell University Library.

Coxeter groups